Adriana Cabrera (born 23 November 1992) is a Puerto Rican handball player who plays for the club Santa Isabel Handball. She is member of the Puerto Rican national team. She competed at the 2015 World Women's Handball Championship in Denmark.

References

External links 
 Adriana Cabrera at the 2019 Pan American Games

1992 births
Living people
Puerto Rican female handball players
Place of birth missing (living people)
Handball players at the 2011 Pan American Games
Handball players at the 2015 Pan American Games
Handball players at the 2019 Pan American Games
Pan American Games competitors for Puerto Rico
Central American and Caribbean Games silver medalists for Puerto Rico
Competitors at the 2018 Central American and Caribbean Games
Central American and Caribbean Games medalists in handball
21st-century Puerto Rican women